A–Z is the debut studio album by Colin Newman, lead singer of post-punk band Wire. It was released in October 1980, through record label Beggars Banquet. "A-Z was planned as the fourth Wire album, but EMI [Wire's label] cancelled studio time in the wake of failed negotiations with the band."

Critical reception 

A–Z has been well received. Jim Derogatis and Wilson Neate, writing in Trouser Press, called Newman's solo work "the most rewarding" of any Wire member's projects outside the main band. Discussing A-Z and Not To, they wrote, "Both albums are inventive and full of hooks, and they continue the cinematic style of Chairs Missing and 154." In his retrospective review for AllMusic, Andy Kellman wrote, "A–Z truly deserves to be held in the same regard as Pink Flag, Chairs Missing and 154". Jason A. Parkes of Head Heritage wrote that it was "probably the best album [released] between the first and second phases of Wire". Richard Cook of the British music magazine NME was less positive, calling the album, along with Newman's subsequent work Provisionally Entitled the Singing Fish, "erratic and needlessly fussy affairs that creak under pretensions to alchemy when studio pottering is nearer the mark."

Legacy 
"Not Me" and "Alone" were covered by This Mortal Coil on the albums It'll End in Tears and Filigree & Shadow, respectively. "S-S-S-Star Eyes" was covered by P-Model and released as a supplementary cassette to an issue of the band's fan club newsletter. "Alone" was used in the 1991 film The Silence of the Lambs.

Track listing

Personnel 
 Colin Newman – guitar, vocals, album cover
 Desmond Simmons – bass guitar, guitar
 Mike Thorne – synthesizer, keyboards, production
 Robert Gotobed – drums
 Charles Bullen – clarinet on "Troisieme"

Technical
 A. Newman – album cover
 Harvey Goldberg – engineering
 Dennis Weinreich – engineering
 Steve Parker – engineering
 Malti Kidia – sleeve layout and typography
 Jack Skinner – cutting

References

External links 
 

1980 debut albums
Post-punk albums by English artists
Colin Newman albums
Beggars Banquet Records albums
Albums produced by Mike Thorne